Zangian (also Romanized as Zangīān) is a village in Valupey Rural District, in the Central District of Savadkuh County, Mazandaran Province, Iran. At the 2006 census, its population was 84, in 33 families.

References 

Populated places in Savadkuh County